Valentina is a brand of "pourable" hot sauce manufactured by Salsa Tamazula, a company based in Guadalajara, Mexico. The sauce, like the parent company's Tamazula hot sauce, is made with puya chilis from Jalisco state, similar to the Guajillo chili and known by the name guajillo puya.

It is typically sold in 12.5-ounce and large (one-liter or 34-ounce) glass bottles, with a flip-top cap permanently attached to the bottle. The cap does not unscrew. The red shape on the label is an outline of the Mexican state of Jalisco. Valentina is described as thicker than Tabasco sauce and less vinegary, with more chili flavor. It comes in two varieties: hot (900 Scoville Heat Units) and extra hot (2100 SHU). The sauce is known for its use as a condiment on several Mexican foods, especially street fare, and its taste, not only for its heat. Valentina's ingredients are water, chili peppers, vinegar, salt, spices and sodium benzoate (as a preservative).

The sauce is named for Valentina Ramírez Avitia, a Mexican revolutionary.

See also
List of hot sauces
Scoville heat scale

References

External links
 Official website

Brand name condiments
Mexican sauces
Hot sauces
Products introduced in 1954